Socialist Party of Bangladesh may refer to one of a number of political parties in Bangladesh:

Socialist Party of Bangladesh
Socialist Party of Bangladesh (Marxist)

See also
 Socialist Party (disambiguation)